Zhang Xiang  (born December 1963 in Nanjing) is a Chinese-American academic administrator, material scientist, optical engineer and physicist. He is the current Vice-Chancellor and President of the University of Hong Kong, where he also serves as professor. 

Zhang was the inaugural Ernest S. Kuh Endowed Chaired Professor at the University of California, Berkeley in the United States, the Director of the National Science Foundation Nano-scale Science and Engineering Center (SINAM), the Director of Materials Science Division and also a Senior Faculty Scientist at Lawrence Berkeley National Laboratory.

Education 
Zhang received his Ph.D. from UC Berkeley, M.S. from University of Minnesota, and B.S. and M.S. from Nanjing University.

Career 
From 1996 to 1999, he was assistant professor at Pennsylvania State University and from 1999 to 2004, Associate Professor and then full professor at University of California, Los Angeles before joining UC Berkeley. Zhang is an elected member of the US National Academy of Engineering and of Academia Sinica, a foreign member of the Chinese Academy of Sciences, and a Fellow of the American Physical Society, the Optical Society of America (OSA), American Association for the Advancement of Science and The International Society for Optical Engineering.

Zhang published more than 390 journal papers. His research focuses on materials physics, metamaterials and nano-photonics.

On 15 December 2017, the University of Hong Kong appointed Zhang to the posts of President and Vice-Chancellor. It was the first time a candidate born and educated to undergraduate degree level in mainland China had been so appointed. He assumed office in July 2018.

Events 
On 3 July 2019, in a statement in response to the Storming of the Legislative Council Complex two days earlier, Zhang said that he had been "disheartened by the violence" and that he "would like to condemn such acts". In response to a backlash from some 2,000 HKU students, alumni and staff, he stated on 11 July that he opposed violence "by any party, and at any juncture". Zhang agreed to a request by the HKU Student Union to participate in a forum open to students, staff, alumni and the media.
 
In April 2021, the HKU Student Union criticized Zhang, and said that he was promoting national security education as a "political task" and was "destroying the autonomy of institutions."

In October 2022, Zhang tested positive for COVID-19.

Academic awards
 1997 NSF CAREER Award
 1998 SME Dell K. Allen Outstanding Young Manufacturing Engineer Award
 1999 ONR Young Investigator Award
 2004 to 2009 Chancellor's Professorship, UC Berkeley
 2008 Time Magazine: "Top Ten Scientific Discoveries of the Year" and 50 Best Inventions of the Year"
 2009 Rohsenow Lecturer, Massachusetts Institute of Technology
2011 Fred Kavli Distinguished Lectureship, Materials Research Society
2011 Miller Professorship, UC Berkeley
2011 Distinguished Visiting Scientist, University of Toronto
2012 William Reynolds Lecturer, Stanford University
2014 Fitzroy Medal
2015 Charles Russ Richards Memorial Award
 2016 Max Born Award
 2016 Julius Springer Award for Applied Physics
2016 Excellence Award in Scientific Leadership
 2017 A. C. Eringen Medal
2017 George W. Pearsall Distinguished Lecturer, Duke University
2017 John R. and Donna S. Hall Engineering Lecturer, Vanderbilt University
2017 John and Virginia Towers Distinguished Lecturer, Michigan Technology University
2019 Physics World: Top 10 Breakthroughs for 2019 
2021 SPIE Mozi Award

Honours
1 July 2019: Justice of the Peace

References

1963 births
Living people
21st-century American engineers
21st-century American physicists
American materials scientists
Chinese emigrants to the United States
Chinese materials scientists
Members of the United States National Academy of Engineering
Nanjing University alumni
Fellows of the American Physical Society
Foreign members of the Chinese Academy of Sciences
Members of Academia Sinica
Optical engineers
Pennsylvania State University faculty
Scientists from Nanjing
University of California, Berkeley alumni
University of California, Los Angeles faculty
University of Minnesota alumni
Vice-Chancellors of the University of Hong Kong